Mariana Muci Torres (born 15 February 1988) is a Venezuelan former professional tennis player.

Muci grew up in the Venezuelan city of Valencia, but was born in Lebanon.

A right-handed player, she featured in a total of 12 ties for the Venezuela Fed Cup team, the first in 2004. She also represented Venezuela in Central American and Caribbean Games and Pan American Games competition. At the 2006 Central American and Caribbean Games she won a gold medal in the women's doubles.

In 2008 she left the professional tour to attend Florida International University and now works as an attorney in Miami.

ITF finals

Doubles: 15 (8–7)

References

External links
 
 
 

1988 births
Living people
Venezuelan female tennis players
Pan American Games competitors for Venezuela
Tennis players at the 2007 Pan American Games
Competitors at the 2006 Central American and Caribbean Games
Competitors at the 2010 Central American and Caribbean Games
Central American and Caribbean Games gold medalists for Venezuela
Central American and Caribbean Games bronze medalists for Venezuela
FIU Panthers women's tennis players
Sportspeople from Valencia, Venezuela
Venezuelan people of Lebanese descent
Central American and Caribbean Games medalists in tennis
South American Games medalists in tennis
South American Games silver medalists for Venezuela
Competitors at the 2006 South American Games
Sportspeople of Lebanese descent
20th-century Venezuelan women
21st-century Venezuelan women